Maryland's Legislative District 9 is one of 47 districts in the state for the Maryland General Assembly. It covers parts of Montgomery County and Howard County. The district is divided into two sub-districts for the Maryland House of Delegates: District 9A and District 9B.

Demographic characteristics
As of the 2020 United States census, the district had a population of 144,375, of whom 109,088 (75.6%) were of voting age. The racial makeup of the district was 89,543 (62.0%) White, 10,757 (7.5%) African American, 287 (0.2%) Native American, 32,325 (22.4%) Asian, 47 (0.0%) Pacific Islander, 2,105 (1.5%) from some other race, and 9,338 (6.5%) from two or more races. Hispanic or Latino of any race were 6,067 (4.2%) of the population.

The district had 103,542 registered voters as of October 17, 2020, of whom 24,054 (23.2%) were registered as unaffiliated, 35,582 (34.4%) were registered as Republicans, 42,420 (41.0%) were registered as Democrats, and 918 (0.9%) were registered to other parties.

Political representation
The district is represented for the 2023–2027 legislative term in the State Senate by Katie Fry Hester (D) and in the House of Delegates by Chao Wu (D, District 9A), Natalie Ziegler (D, District 9A) and M. Courtney Watson (D, District 9B).

References

Carroll County, Maryland
Howard County, Maryland
09